Park Min-ha (born July 2, 2007) is a South Korean actress. Park began her career as a child actress in 2011 and has appeared in such productions as the South Korean disaster film Flu (2013), the Korean drama television series King of Ambition (2013), and the music video for K.Will's song "Love Blossom" (2013).

Personal life 
Her father is SBS anchorman Park Chan-min.

Filmography

Film

Television series

Variety show

Music video

Awards and nominations

References

External links 

 Park Min-ha Fan Cafe at Daum 
 
 

2007 births
Living people
People from Gunpo
South Korean child actresses
South Korean television actresses
South Korean film actresses